Wang Kehan (born 15 November 1995) is a Chinese Sanda kickboxer, who has spent the majority of her career fighting under the banner of Kunlun Fight in her native China.

Between July 2018 and April 2019 she was ranked #6 woman in the world and #5 between June 2019 and March 2020 by Combat Press. Combat Press has continually ranked her in the top ten since ranking her #4 in November 2016, before dropping her from the rankings in April 2020 due to inactivity.

She is the former IPCC Muay Thai World Champion, WCK Muay Thai and Wu Lin Feng Muay Thai Champion.

Background
Kehan's martials arts career began in 2005, when she began training Wushu Sanda. In 2010 she began training with the national team, but suffered an injury in 2012, which sidelined her for the remainder of the year. After a successful recovery, she decided to transition to kickboxing.

Kickboxing career
In 2013, Wang Kehan fought against Ekaterina Vandaryeva during C3: King of Fighters. She won the fight in the third round by TKO.

After dropping an extra round decision to Jemyma Betrian, she scored a decision win over Marloes Merza and a TKO win over Taina. She would then enter the WCK Super Bantamweight tournament. Kehan TKO'd Lindsay Ball in the semi finals, and won a unanimous decision over Ciara Irvine to win her first major title.

In her next fight she faced Masha Valent during Kunlun Fight 10. She won by a tornado kick to clinch the IPCC Muay Thai title.

In the following fight Kehan fought Emily Wahby for the WLF 60 kg World Title. She won a unanimous decision, to win her third title in a row.

Over the next two years, Kehan won her next 7 fights in a row, with notable wins over Irina Mazepa and Vicky Church. She then entered the Mulan 51.5 kg Tournament. In the quarter finals she beat Juliana Werner by a 2nd-round TKO. In the semi finals she beat Anke Van Gestel by a unanimous decision after an extra round. In the finals she fought Anissa Haddaoui, and lost a unanimous decision, after an extra round.

After losing in the finals of the tournament, Kehan went on a four fight winning streak, with notable wins over Laëtitia Madjene and Mallaury Kalachnikoff.

Championships and accomplishments
International Professional Combat Council
IPCC Muay Thai Bantamweight World Championship (59 kg)
World Championship Muay Thai
WCK Super Bantamweight World Championship 
Wu Ling Fen
WLF Muay Thai Bantamweight World Championship
Kunlun Fight
Kunlun Fight Mulan 61.5 kg Mulan Tournament Runner up

Kickboxing record

|-  bgcolor=
|-  bgcolor="#CCFFCC"
| 22 Oct 2018|| Win||align=left| Mallaury Kalachnikoff || Kunlun Fight 78 || Tongling, China || Decision (Majority) || 3 || 3:00|| 33-2
|-
|-  bgcolor="#CCFFCC"
| 13 May 2018|| Win||align=left| Aurélie Froment || Kunlun Fight 74 || Jinan, China || Decision (Unanimous) || 3 || 3:00|| 32-2
|-
|-  bgcolor="#CCFFCC"
| 11 Mar 2018|| Win||align=left| Laëtitia Madjene || Kunlun Fight 70 || Sanya, Hainan, China || Decision (Unanimous) || 3 || 3:00|| 31-2
|-
|-  bgcolor="#CCFFCC"
| 17 Dec 2017|| Win||align=left| Paola Cappucci || Kunlun Fight 68 || Sanya, China || Decision (Unanimous) || 3 || 3:00|| 30-2
|-
|-  bgcolor="#FFBBBB"
| 15 May 2017|| Loss||align=left| Anissa Haddaoui || Kunlun Fight 64 || Chongqing, China || Decision (Ext. Round) || 4 || 3:00|| 29-2
|-
! style=background:white colspan=9 |
|-
|-  bgcolor="#CCFFCC"
| 14 May 2017|| Win||align=left| Anke Van Gestel || Kunlun Fight 61 || Sanya, Hainan, China || Decision (Ext. Round) || 4 || 3:00 || 29-1
|-
! style=background:white colspan=9 |
|-
|-  bgcolor="#CCFFCC"
| 23 Apr 2017|| Win||align=left| Juliana Werner || Kunlun Fight 60 || Guizhou, China || TKO || 2 || ? || 28-1
|-
! style=background:white colspan=9 |
|-
|-  bgcolor="#CCFFCC"
| 30 Oct 2016|| Win||align=left| Korina Papachrysanthou || Kunlun Fight 54 || Wuhan, China || TKO (Punches) || 1 || ? || 27-1
|-
|-  bgcolor="#CCFFCC"
| 10 Sep 2016|| Win||align=left| Nathalie Visschers  || Kunlun Fight 51 || Fuzhou, China || TKO (Punches) || 3 || ? || 26-1
|-
|-  bgcolor="#CCFFCC"
| 5 Jun 2016|| Win||align=left| Shana Lammers || Kunlun Fight 45 || Chengdu, China || TKO (Punches) || 2 || ? || 25-1
|-
|-  bgcolor="#CCFFCC"
| 26 Apr 2016|| Win||align=left| Rachel Adamus || Kunlun Fight 43 || Zhoukou, China || TKO (Punches) || 3 || ? || 24-1
|-
|-  bgcolor="#CCFFCC"
| 23 Jan 2016|| Win||align=left| Marisa Pires || Kunlun Fight 37 || Sanya, China || TKO (Punches) || 2 || ? || 23-1
|-
|-  bgcolor="#CCFFCC"
| 30 Nov 2015|| Win||align=left| Vicky Church || WCK Muay Thai: USA vs China || Las Vegas, Nevada, United States || TKO (Punches) || 2 || ? || 22-1
|-
|-  bgcolor="#CCFFCC"
| 28 Oct 2015|| Win||align=left| Michaela Michl || Kunlun Fight 32 || Dazhou, China || Decision (Unanimous) || 3 || 3:00 || 21-1
|-
|-  bgcolor="#CCFFCC"
| 3 Jan 2015|| Win||align=left| Irina Mazepa || Kunlun Fight 15 || Nanjing, China || Decision (Unanimous) || 3 || 3:00 || 20-1
|-
|-  bgcolor="#CCFFCC"
| 4 Dec 2014|| Win||align=left| Emily Wahby || Kunlun Fight 14 || Bangkok, Thailand || Decision (Unanimous) || 3 || 3:00 || 19-1
|-
! style=background:white colspan=9 |
|-
|-  bgcolor="#CCFFCC"
| 13 Sep 2014|| Win||align=left| Masha Valent || Kunlun Fight 10 || Minsk, Belarus || KO (Tornado Kick) || 3 || ? || 18-1
|-
! style=background:white colspan=9 |
|-
|-  bgcolor="#CCFFCC"
| 7 Jun 2014|| Win||align=left| Ciara Irvine || WCK Muay Thai || Temecula, California, United States || Decision (Unanimous) || 3 || ? || 17-1
|-
! style=background:white colspan=9 |
|-
|-  bgcolor="#CCFFCC"
| 7 Jun 2014|| Win||align=left| Lindsay Ball || WCK Muay Thai || Temecula, California, United States || TKO || 2 || 2:55 || 16-1
|-
! style=background:white colspan=9 |
|-
|-  bgcolor="#CCFFCC"
| 27 Apr 2014|| Win||align=left| Taina || Kunlun Fight 4 || Manila, Philippines || TKO (Punches) || 3 || ? || 15-1
|-
|-  bgcolor="#CCFFCC"
| 30 Mar 2014|| Win||align=left| Marloes Merza || Kunlun Fight 3 || Harbin, China || Decision (Unanimous) || 3 || 3:00 || 14-1
|-
|-  bgcolor="#FFBBBB"
| 18 Jan 2014|| Loss||align=left| Jemyma Betrian || Wu Lin Feng || Hubei, China || Decision (Etr. Round) || 4 || 3:00 || 13-1
|-
|-  bgcolor="#CCFFCC"
| 3 May 2013|| Win||align=left| Ekaterina Vandaryeva || C3: King of Fighters || Xichang, China || TKO (Punches) || 3 || ? || 13-0
|-
|-
| colspan=9 | Legend:

See also
 List of female kickboxers

References 

1995 births
Living people
Sportspeople from Heilongjiang
People from Mudanjiang
Chinese female kickboxers
Chinese sanshou practitioners